Moriago della Battaglia is a comune (municipality) in the Province of Treviso in the Italian region Veneto, located about  northwest of Venice and about  northwest of Treviso.

Moriago della Battaglia borders the following municipalities: Crocetta del Montello, Farra di Soligo, Sernaglia della Battaglia, Vidor, Volpago del Montello. The town takes its name from the position it had during World War I, when it was on the front of the Battle of the Piave.

References

Cities and towns in Veneto